ARP Instruments, Inc. was a Lexington, Massachusetts manufacturer of electronic musical instruments, founded by Alan Robert Pearlman in 1969. It created a popular and commercially successful range of synthesizers throughout the 1970s before declaring bankruptcy in 1981. The company earned a reputation for producing excellent sounding, innovative instruments and was granted several patents for the technology it developed.

History

Background
Alan Pearlman was an engineering student at Worcester Polytechnic Institute, Massachusetts in 1948 when he foresaw the coming age of electronic music and synthesizers. He later wrote:
"The electronic instrument's value is chiefly as a novelty. With greater attention on the part of the engineer to the needs of the musician, the day may not be too remote when the electronic instrument may take its place ... as a versatile, powerful, and expressive instrument."

Beginnings

Following 21 years of experience in electronic engineering and entrepreneurship, Pearlman founded the company in 1969 with $100,000 of personal funds and a matching amount from investors, with fellow engineering graduate David Friend  on board from the beginning as the co-founder of the company. The company derived its name from Pearlman's initials, and existed briefly as the ARP Instrument Division of Tonus, Inc.
 Their first instrument, the ARP 2500, was released the following year.

Success

The ARP 2600 began production in 1971. As an engineer, Pearlman had little understanding of the music industry or its potential audience. He felt the best market for synthesizers would be music departments at schools and universities, and designed the instrument to be easy to use for this reason. David Friend and musician Roger Powell toured the US demonstrating the 2600 to various musicians and dealers, and it quickly became a popular instrument. The first significant user of the 2600 was Edgar Winter, who connected the keyboard controller of the 2600 to the main unit via a long extension cord, allowing him to wear the synth around his neck like a keytar. Stevie Wonder was an early adopter of the 2600, who had the control panel instructions labelled in Braille.

Throughout the 1970s, ARP was the main competitor to Moog Music and eventually surpassed Moog to become the world's leading manufacturer of electronic musical instruments. Performers found that ARP synthesizers were better at staying in tune than Moogs owing to superior oscillator design. The 2500 used a matrix-signal switching system instead of patch cords on a Moog, which led to some performers complaining about crosstalk between signal paths. The 2600 on the other hand, used hardwired ("normaled") signal paths that could be modified with switch settings, or completely overridden using patch cords. 

There were two main camps among synthesizer musicians — the Minimoog players and the ARP Odyssey/ARP 2600  players — with most proponents dedicated to their choice, although some players decided to pick and choose between the two for specific effect, as well as many who dabbled with products produced by other manufacturers. Notably, the 2500 was featured in the hit movie Close Encounters of the Third Kind; ARP's Vice President of Engineering, Phillip Dodds, was sent to install the unit on the movie set and was subsequently cast as Jean Claude, the musician who played the now famous 5-note sequence on the huge synthesizer in an attempt to communicate with the alien mothership.

The Odyssey was released in 1972. It was designed as a cut-down version of the 2600 for touring musicians, competing with the Minimoog, and contained a three-octave keyboard. Later versions featured a pressure-pad operated pitch control system.

The best selling ARP synthesizer was the Omni, released in 1975. It was a fully polyphonic keyboard that used top-octave divide-down oscillators that had been used on electronic organs, and competed with the Polymoog. In 1977, the company peaked financially with $7 million sales. The Quadra was released the following year, and contained a number of synthesizer modules combined and controlled by a microprocessor.

Decline

The demise of ARP Instruments stemmed from financial difficulties following development of the ARP Avatar, a synthesizer module virtually identical to the ARP Odyssey without a keyboard and intended to be played by a solid body electric guitar via a specially-mounted hexaphonic guitar pickup whose signals were then processed through discrete pitch-to-voltage converters.

Although an excellent, groundbreaking instrument by all accounts, the Avatar failed to sell well. ARP Instruments was never able to recoup the research and development costs associated with the Avatar project and after several more attempts to produce successful instruments such as the ARP Quadra, ARP 16-Voice & 4-Voice Pianos, and the ARP Solus, the company finally declared bankruptcy in May 1981.

During the liquidation process, the company's assets and the rights to the manufacture of the 4-Voice Piano and also the prototype ARP Chroma – the company's most sophisticated instrument design to date – were sold to CBS Musical Instruments for $350,000. The project was completed at CBS R&D, and the renamed Rhodes Chroma was produced from 1982 to late 1983.  The instrument has a flexible voice architecture, 16-note polyphony, weighted, wooden keyboard action with 256 velocity levels, a single slider parameter editing system (subsequently implemented on the Yamaha DX7); and the inclusion of a proprietary digital interface system that predated MIDI. It was controlled internally by an Intel 80186 microprocessor.

Aftermath 

In 2015, almost three and a half decades after it closed its doors, the company's second flagship instrument, the ARP Odyssey, was brought back into production by Korg, working in collaboration with David Friend, Alan Pearlman's co-founder at ARP. In 2019, German manufacturer Behringer released their own version of the instrument, the Behringer Odyssey.

In 2013, Swedish DIY Synthesizer designer The Human Comparator released a DIY remake of the ARP 2600, dubbed the TTSH ("Two-Thousand Six Hundred"). Korg released a limited-edition revival of the ARP 2600 called the 2600 FS in 2019, with the instrument officially shipping in early 2020. Behringer likewise designed a modernized rack-mountable version of its own, the "Behringer 2600", which became available in early 2021.

Both the ARP 2600 and Arp Odyssey have been professionally recreated as virtual instruments. GForce Software and Arturia have modeled the 2600, while GForce and Korg offer virtual versions of the Odyssey, the latter officially endorsed by David Friend.

The freeware synthesizer emulator Bristol features software versions of the ARP 2600, ARP Odyssey, ARP Axxe, and ARP Solina String Machine.

Products

 1970 – ARP 2500 analog modular synthesizer, patched with a switch matrix, noted for its reliable tuning compared to competitors Moog and Buchla

 1970 – ARP Soloist (small, portable, monophonic preset, aftertouch sensitive synthesizer)
 1971 – ARP 2600 (smaller, more portable analog semi-modular synthesizer, pre-patched and patchable with cables)
 1972 – ARP Odyssey (pre-patched analog duophonic synthesizer, a truly portable performance instrument, a competitor of the Minimoog)
 1972 – ARP Pro Soloist (small, portable, monophonic preset, aftertouch sensitive synthesizer – updated version of Soloist)

 1974 – ARP String Ensemble (polyphonic string voice keyboard manufactured by Solina)
 1974 – ARP Explorer (small, portable, monophonic preset, programmable sounds)
 1975 – ARP Little Brother (keyboardless monophonic expander module)

 1975 – ARP Omni (polyphonic string synthesizer with rudimentary polyphonic synthesizer functions)
<div style="clear:right;float:right;margin:-1.65ex 0 -1.65ex 0;">
</div -->

 1975 – ARP Axxe (pre-patched single oscillator analog synthesizer)
 1975 – ARP String Synthesizer (a combination of the String Ensemble and the Explorer)
 1976 – ARP Sequencer (desktop analog music sequencer)
 1977 – ARP Pro/DGX (small, portable, monophonic preset, aftertouch sensitive synthesizer – updated version of Pro Soloist)
 1977 – ARP Omni 2 (polyphonic string synthesizer with rudimentary polyphonic synthesizer functions – updated version of Omni)
 1977 – ARP Avatar (an Odyssey module fitted with a guitar pitch controller)
 1978 – ARP Quadra (4 microprocessor-controlled analog synthesizers in one)
 1979 – ARP Quartet (polyphonic orchestral synthesizer not manufactured by ARP – just bought in from Siel and rebadged)
 1979 – ARP 16-Voice Electronic Piano (model 3363) / ARP 4-Voice Electronic Piano (model 3553)
 1980 – ARP Solus (pre-patched analog monophonic synthesizer)
 1981 – ARP Chroma (microprocessor controlled analog polyphonic synthesizer – sold to CBS/Rhodes when ARP closed)

Notable users 
Some notable ARP users and endorsers include:
(in alphabetically order of group or family name)

Tony Banks of Genesis played an ARP 2600, an ARP Pro Soloist (on the album Selling England by the Pound) and later an ARP Quadra.
David Bowie is listed as using an "arp" in the album Low.
The BBC Radiophonic Workshop's Peter Howell used an ARP ODYSSEY II for the lead sound to update the Doctor Who TV theme in the early 1980s.

Vince Clarke plays an ARP 2500, two ARP 2600 and two ARP Sequencers.
Chick Corea played an ARP Odyssey on the album My Spanish Heart.

Billy Currie of Ultravox and Visage (band) used an ARP Odyssey.
 Paul Davis played an ARP Odyssey, ARP 2500, ARP 2600 and ARP Quadra.
 Eumir Deodato used an ARP as the bass instrument on "Juanita" from the 1976 album Very Together.
Dennis DeYoung of Styx played an "Arp" on the album Styx II.
Daryl Dragon of Captain & Tennille played an ARP String Ensemble on the album Love Will Keep Us Together.
Depeche Mode use an ARP 2600.
Devo used an ARP Odyssey on their Freedom of Choice tour.
George Duke played an ARP Odyssey on the album Guardian Of The Light.

Brian Eno is listed as playing "report arp" in David Bowie's album Low.

Dave Formula played an ARP Odyssey.

Miquette Giraudy played an ARP Omni on Steve Hillage's album Rainbow Dome Musick.
The Grateful Dead.

Herbie Hancock played an ARP Odyssey, an ARP Soloist and ARP 2600 and an ARP String Ensemble in the album Thrust.
Steve Hillage played an "Arp" on the album Rainbow Dome Musick.

Jean Michel Jarre played an ARP 2500. On the album Equinoxe he played an ARP 2600 and an ARP Sequencer.
Elton John played an ARP String Ensemble on the album Captain Fantastic and the Brown Dirt Cowboy, and played an ARP on "Funeral For a Friend" on the album Goodbye Yellow Brick Road.

Kraftwerk used an ARP Odyssey on the album Autobahn. The band also used an ARP Omni 1 on various albums and live performances.

Rick van der Linden of Ekseption played an ARP 2600 on the album Trinity.
Kerry Livgren and Steve Walsh of Kansas use an "Arp" on the album Song for America.

Scott McCaughey plays an ARP Odyssey on several songs on R.E.M.'s New Adventures In Hi-Fi.
Christine McVie of Fleetwood Mac played an ARP String Ensemble on the album Heroes Are Hard To Find and on Rumours, notably her composition "Don't Stop".
Hugo Montenegro played an ARP 2500.

Gary Numan played an ARP Pro Soloist on the album Telekon.

Jimmy Page played an ARP 2500./
Anthony Phillips played an ARP String Ensemble and ARP Pro Soloist on his 1977 album The Geese and the Ghost. The album's title derived from Phillips' nicknames for two sounds he produced on the Pro Soloist, both of which feature on the title track.
Skinny Puppy played an ARP 2600 on their early releases and an ARP 2500 and 2600 are currently in use at Subconscious Communications.

Eliane Radigue played an ARP 2500 on the album Triptych.

Klaus Schulze played an ARP Odyssey and an ARP 2600 in the album Picture Music.
Dave Sinclair and Rupert Hine played an "Arp" in Caravan's album For Girls Who Grow Plump in the Night.
Gerald Shapiro played an ARP 2500.
Steven Spielberg used an ARP 2500 in the movie Close Encounters of the Third Kind.

Todd Terje uses an ARP Odyssey, an ARP Sequencer and an ARP 2600 in most of his productions. He used the 2600 exclusively for his It's The Arps EP from 2012, which contains his biggest hit to date, Inspector Norse.
Pete Townshend of The Who wrote the song "Won't Get Fooled Again" on an ARP 2500.

Joe Walsh played an "Arp" on the album Barnstorm.
Edgar Winter used the ARP 2600 on the rock classic "Frankenstein".
Stevie Wonder used a custom Braille-labeled ARP 2600.

Joe Zawinul of Weather Report used two ARP 2600s and later an ARP Quadra and an ARP Chroma.

Notes

References

External links

 The Rise and Fall of ARP Instruments (article from April 1983, Keyboard Magazine)
 Arp continued into Virtual Instruments Arp 2600 and Arp Axxe (Kikaxxe) at wayoutware.com WOW!
 Films and pictures of the Arp Solina
 ARP Instruments at Synthmuseum.com
 Retrosound – ARP Odyssey and Solina String Ensemble pics and info 
 Solina VSTi plugin
 Arp Odyssey page with sounds and pics

Synthesizer manufacturing companies of the United States
Musical instrument manufacturing companies of the United States